Hutson Brent Charles (born 16 September 1965) is a Trinidadian retired footballer who played as a midfielder. Charles is also known as "Baba".

As a player, he represented Defence Force. Charles participated in Trinidad's 1990, 1994 and 1998 FIFA World Cup qualifying campaigns. He was also named in Trinidad and Tobago's 1992 and 1994 Caribbean Cup winning squads, scoring two goals in the final of the latter.

References

1965 births
Living people
Trinidad and Tobago footballers
Trinidad and Tobago football managers
Sportspeople from Port of Spain
Association football midfielders
Defence Force F.C. players
TT Pro League managers
Trinidad and Tobago international footballers
1991 CONCACAF Gold Cup players
Trinidad and Tobago national football team managers